Bad Kitty is a series of American children's books by Nick Bruel, about a housecat named Kitty, who often wreaks havoc about her owner's home. The first book, Bad Kitty, was a picture book, published in 2005, and featured Kitty encountering foods and doing activities categorized by the alphabet. It was followed by Poor Puppy, which deals with Kitty's housemate, Puppy. Bruel also created chapter books including Bad Kitty Gets a Bath, Happy Birthday, Bad Kitty, Bad Kitty vs. Uncle Murray: The Uproar at the Front Door, Bad Kitty Meets the Baby and Bad Kitty for President. The chapter books feature tips on caring for cats. In late 2011, Bruel published A Bad Kitty Christmas as a picture book. The series won a Wyoming Buckaroo Book Award. The series has spawned three boxed sets. A TV series based on the book series is currently in development.

Characters

Main

 Kitty – The title character of the series; she is a housecat who wreaks havoc around her owner's home when she is in a bad mood, hence the name. She has black fur and a white tuft of fur on her chest. According to Bruel, Kitty is physically modeled after a cat named Zou-zou he had as a child who was all black except for a small tuft of white fur on her chest.
 Puppy – He is introduced in the series at the end of Bad Kitty and is the subject of the picture book Poor Puppy and the novel Puppy's Big Day.
 The owner – The narrator of the series. His face is not seen in the books.
 Uncle Murray – The owner's uncle, who is somewhat forgetful and lazy, but still kind and good with animals. Uncle Murray was only mentioned twice in the first book, Bad Kitty. In the chapter books, he is given sections called "Uncle Murray's Fun Facts". He is a major character in the book, Bad Kitty vs. Uncle Murray: The Uproar at the Front Door. His wife is named Jeannie. Bruel wrote that Murray is named after his real life Uncle Murray.
 Baby – A baby who causes a lot of trouble, who is introduced at the end of Bad Kitty vs. Uncle Murray. Her name is not known.

Kitty's friends
The following is a list of cats that make their debuts in Happy Birthday, Bad Kitty.
 Big Kitty – Big Kitty is a Maine Coon who is the biggest cat in the series.
 The Twin Kitties – The Twin Kitties are calico American Shorthairs who love to play.
 Stinky Kitty – Stinky Kitty is a Persian who is always getting dirty and smelly.
 Chatty Kitty – Chatty Kitty is a Siamese who is the most talkative cat in the neighborhood. The translations of her speech are presented as footnotes.
 Pretty Kitty – Pretty Kitty is a Turkish Angora who has won many cat shows and whom all of the male cats are in love with.
 Strange Kitty – Strange Kitty is a Sphynx who is called strange for reading comic books instead of (like cats) chasing mice. Unlike the other cats, Strange Kitty can talk.

Minor characters
 Power Mouse – Strange Kitty's buddy and sidekick. He is one of the only animal characters that can talk. 
 Mama Kitty – Kitty's mother
 Old Lady – A senior woman that appeared in A Bad Kitty Christmas
 Old Kitty – The former president of the Neighborhood Cat Club
 Petunia – A bulldog and a student in Bad Kitty: School Daze. She is one of the only animal characters that can talk. 
 Dr. Lagomorph – A rabbit and archenemy of Strange Kitty's alter ego, Captain Fantasticat. He is one of the few animal characters that can talk.  Bruel mentioned that lagomorph is the biological name for the family of rabbits.
The Chickens – There are two chickens that mainly appear in Bad Kitty Takes the Test and Bad Kitty Goes on Vacation, and have a business plan to open different places around the world that will attract people and there love of cats, only to try and change there minds and make chickens the house pet, and cats the farm animals that you eat on thanks giving dinners.

Books
{| class="wikitable" style="width:100%;"
|-
! No. !! Title !! Date !! Format !! Length
! style="width:180px;"| ISBN
{{Book list
 | book_number    = 1
 | title          = Bad Kitty
 | alt_title      =
 | publish_date   = October 1, 2005
 | genre          = Picture book
 | aux1           = 40pp
 | isbn           = 978-1596430693
 | line_color     = shortstory
 | short_summary  = Kitty was a good kitty until her owners make her eat vegetables, listed from A to Z. Kitty is repulsed, and becomes a bad kitty. She does a bunch of activities. The owners come back from the store and present Kitty with good food. Kitty is very happy, so she does some good activities. The owners then reward Kitty with a new friend: Puppy!
}}

 

|}

Reception
The series was met with mostly positive reviews. Lynn Beckwith at Bookpage.com describes Kitty as "a joyfully silly portrait of a picky eater with attitude", and that Bruel's illustrations are bold and humorous.

In 2020, the Bad Kitty'' series was named the 37th most banned and challenged book in the United States between 2010 and 2019, according to the American Library Association.

References

2005 children's books
American picture books
Series of children's books
Cats in literature